Aluminium-copper alloys (AlCu) are aluminum alloys that consist largely of aluminum (Al) and traces of copper (Cu) as the main alloying elements. Important grades also contain additives of magnesium and silicon (AlCu(Mg,Si)), often manganese is also included to increase strength (see Aluminum-manganese alloys). The main area of ​​application is aircraft construction. The alloys have medium to high strength and can be age-hardened. They are both . Also available as cast alloy. Their susceptibility to corrosion and their poor weldability are disadvantageous. 

Duralumin is the oldest variety in this group and goes back to Alfred Wilm, who discovered it in 1903. Aluminium could only be used as a widespread construction material thanks to the aluminium-copper alloys, as pure aluminium is much too soft for this and other hardenable alloys such as [aluminium-magnesium-silicon alloys]] (AlMgSi) or the naturally hard (non-hardenable) alloys.

Aluminium-copper alloys were standardised in the 2000 series by the international alloy designation system (IADS) which was originally created in 1970 by the Aluminum Association. 2000s series includes 2014 and 2024 alloys used in airframe fabrication.

History 

Duralumin is a trade name for one of the earliest types of age-hardenable aluminium alloys. The term is a combination of Dürener and aluminium. Its use as a trade name is obsolete. Duralumin was developed by the German metallurgist Alfred Wilm at Dürener Metallwerke AG. In 1903, Wilm discovered that after quenching, an aluminium alloy containing 4% copper would harden when left at room temperature for several days. Further improvements led to the introduction of duralumin in 1909. The name is mainly used in pop-science to describe all Al-Cu alloys system.

Aluminium-copper alloys were standardised in the 2000 series by the international alloy designation system (IADS) which was originally created in 1970 by the Aluminum Association. 2000s series includes 2014 and 2024 alloys used in airframe fabrication.

Pure AlCu wrought alloys 

All AlCu alloys are based on the system of pure AlCu alloys.

Solubility of copper and phases 
Aluminum forms a eutectic with copper at 547 °C and 33 mass percent copper, which also corresponds to the maximum solubility. At lower temperatures, the solubility drops sharply; at room temperature it is only 0.1%.

At higher copper contents, Al2Cu is formed, an intermetallic phase. There are also the partially coherent ones - and -phases.

Microstructural Transformations 

After casting, the material is usually oversaturated - Mixed crystal, which also contains more copper at room temperature than could actually be dissolved at this temperature.

 After that, GP zones (GP(I) zones) form at temperatures below 80 °C, in which increased concentrations of copper are present, but which do not yet have a structure or form their own phases.
 At somewhat higher temperatures of up to 250 °C, this forms -phase (also called GP(II) zones), which increases strength.
 At even higher temperatures, the partially coherent forms -Phase
 and at still higher temperatures of about 300 °C the incoherent one forms -phase in which the strength decreases again.

The individual temperature ranges overlap: Even at low temperatures, there is formation of - or  phases, but these form much more slowly than the GP(I/II) zones. Each of the phases forms faster the higher the temperature.

GP(I) zones 
The formation of GP(I) zones is referred to as natural hardening and occurs at temperatures up to 80 °C. They are tiny disc-shaped layers just one atom thick and 2 to 5 nanometers in diameter. With time, the number of zones increases and the copper concentration in them increases, but not their diameter. They are coherent with the aluminum lattice and form on the {100} planes.

GP(II) zones 
The GP(II) zones (-phases) are largely responsible for the increase in strength of the AlCu alloys. They are coherent with the aluminium crystal and consist of alternating layers of aluminum and copper with layer thicknesses of about 10 nanometers and dimensions of up to 150 nanometers. In contrast to the GP(I) zones, these are three-dimensional precipitations. Their layers are parallel to the aluminum {100} plane. From the -phase forms the -phases, but there are overlaps.

The GP(II) zones need vacancies for growth, which is why a lack of these (e.g. due to magnesium) leads to delayed growth.

Partially coherent phases 
The -phase is only partially coherent with the aluminum lattice and forms at temperatures from 150 °C to 300 °C. It has the form of platelets and can arise from the GP(II) zones. However, it can also arise directly as a precipitation from the mixed crystal. In the first case, the increasing interfacial energy is reduced by dislocations, in the second case, the precipitates form preferentially at dislocations.

Incoherent phases 
The -phase is incoherent with the lattice of the mixed crystal. It forms at temperatures of 300 °C and more. It usually forms larger particles with a larger spacing than the other phases and thus does not lead to any increase in strength or even to a drop if its formation takes place at the expense of the other phases. The -phase also occurs at temperatures between 150 °C and 250 °C as precipitation at grain boundaries, as this reduces the interfacial energy.

The -phase leads to a partial intergranular fracture; however, the fracture behavior remains ductile overall. The change in fracture behavior is caused by precipitation-free zones at the grain boundaries.

The -phase has a greater potential difference compared to the mixed crystal, so that layer corrosion and intergranular corrosion can occur. With longer annealing times, the inside of the grains also separate -phases and the potential difference is lower.

Grades, alloying elements and contents 

The copper content is usually between 3 and 6%. Between 0.3% and 6% they are regarded as not weldable or very difficult to weld (by fusion welding), with higher Cu contents they are weldable. Most types also contain additives of magnesium, manganese and silicon to increase strength. Lead and bismuth form small inclusions that melt at low temperatures, resulting in better chip formation, similar to free-cutting steel. The heat resistance is increased by adding nickel and iron.

Iron, found as an impurity in engineering alloys, prevents strain hardening. Adding magnesium makes it possible again. Larger amounts of magnesium up to 1.5% increase strength and elongation at break (see Aluminium-magnesium alloy). Manganese is also used to increase strength (see AlMn). Larger amounts, however, have negative side effects, so the content is limited to around 1% Mn. Smaller additions of silicon are added to bind iron, since it prefers to form the AlFeSi phase, while the formation of Al7Cu2 Fe would remove larger amounts of copper from the material, which then no longer leads to the formation of phases that are actually desired (especially Al2Cu, copper aluminide) are present. Larger amounts of silicon are alloyed to form with magnesium Mg 2 Si (magnesium silicide) which, like aluminium-magnesium-silicon alloy, improves strength and hardenability.

Lithium is added to some alloys with contents between 1.5% and 2.5%. Due to the very low density of Li (0.53 g/cm³ compared to 2.7 g/cm³ of aluminium), this leads to lighter components, which is particularly advantageous in aviation. See aluminium-lithium alloy for details.

Cast Alloys 
Cast alloys contain about 4% copper and small amounts of other additives that improve castability, including titanium and magnesium. The starting material is primary aluminum; In contrast to other cast aluminum alloys, secondary aluminum (made from scrap) is not used because it reduces elongation at break and toughness. The AlCu cast alloys are prone to hot cracking and are used in the T4 and T6 hardening states.

The following table shows the composition of some grades according to DIN EN 1706. All data in percent by mass, the rest is aluminum.

Wrought alloys

AlCuMg(Si,Mn) wrought alloys 
The AlCuMg alloys represent the most important group of AlCu alloys. Many other phases can form in them:

 Al8 Mg5 (-phase, see )
 Al2 CuMg, the S phase
 Al6 Mg4 Cu, the T phase

Additions of magnesium accelerate cold hardening. Which phases are formed depends primarily on the ratio of copper to magnesium. If the ratio is less than 1/1, clusters containing Cu and Mg are eliminated. At a ratio above 1.5/1, which is the case with most engineering alloys, the forms preferentially-Phase. These alloys have significantly higher hardness and strength.

Mechanical properties 
Conditions:

 O soft (also hot-formed with the same strength limit values).
 T3: solution annealed, quenched, work hardened and naturally aged
 T4: solution annealed, quenched and artificially aged
 T6: solution heat treated, quenched and artificially aged
 T8: solution annealed, cold worked and artificially aged

2000 series 
2000 series were formerly referred to as duralumin.

Applications 

Corrosion resistance can be greatly enhanced by the metallurgical bonding of a high-purity aluminium surface layer, referred to as alclad-duralum. Alclad materials are commonly used in the aircraft industry to this day. The alloys are processed by rolling, forging, extrusion and partly by casting. Typical uses for wrought Al-Cu alloys include:

 2011: Wire, rod, and bar for screw machine products. Applications where good machinability and good strength are required.
 2014: Heavy-duty forgings, plate, and extrusions for aircraft fittings, wheels, and major structural components, space booster tankage and structure, truck frame and suspension components. Applications requiring high strength and hardness including service at elevated temperatures.
 2017 or Avional (France): Around 1% Si. Good machinability. Acceptable resistance to corrosion in air and mechanical properties. Also called AU4G in France. Used for aircraft applications between the wars in France and Italy. Also saw some use in motor-racing applications from the 1960s, as it is a tolerant alloy that could be press-formed with relatively unsophisticated equipment.
 2024: Aircraft structures, rivets, hardware, truck wheels, screw machine products, and other structural applications.
 2036: Sheet for auto body panels
 2048: Sheet and plate in structural components for aerospace application and military equipment

Aviation 

German scientific literature openly published information about duralumin, its composition and heat treatment, before the outbreak of World War I in 1914. Despite this, use of the alloy outside  Germany did not occur until after fighting ended in 1918. Reports of German use during World War I, even in technical journals such as Flight, could still mis-identify its key alloying component as magnesium rather than copper. Engineers in the UK showed little interest in duralumin until after the war.

The earliest known attempt to use duralumin for a heavier-than-air aircraft structure occurred in 1916, when Hugo Junkers first introduced its use in the airframe of the Junkers J 3, a single-engined monoplane "technology demonstrator" that marked the first use of the Junkers trademark duralumin corrugated skinning.  The Junkers company completed only the covered wings and tubular fuselage framework of the J 3 before abandoning its development. The slightly later, solely IdFlieg-designated Junkers J.I armoured sesquiplane of 1917, known to the factory as the Junkers J 4, had its all-metal wings and horizontal stabilizer made in the same manner as the J 3's wings had been, like the experimental and airworthy all-duralumin Junkers J 7 single-seat fighter design, which led to the Junkers D.I low-wing monoplane fighter, introducing all-duralumin aircraft structural technology to  German military aviation in 1918.

Its first use in aerostatic airframes came in rigid airship frames, eventually including all those of the "Great Airship" era of the 1920s and 1930s: the British-built R-100, the German passenger Zeppelins LZ 127 Graf Zeppelin, LZ 129 Hindenburg, LZ 130 Graf Zeppelin II, and the U.S. Navy airships USS Los Angeles (ZR-3, ex-LZ 126), USS Akron (ZRS-4) and USS Macon (ZRS-5).

2000 series were once the most common aerospace alloys, but because they were susceptible to stress corrosion cracking, they are increasingly being replaced by 7000 series in new designs.

Bicycling 
Duralumin was used to manufacture bicycle components and framesets from the 1930s to 1990s. Several companies in Saint-Étienne, France stood out for their early, innovative adoption of duralumin: in 1932, Verot et Perrin developed the first light alloy crank arms; in 1934, Haubtmann released a complete crankset; from 1935 on, Duralumin freewheels, derailleurs, pedals, brakes and handlebars were manufactured by several companies.

Complete framesets followed quickly, including those manufactured by: Mercier (and Aviac and other licensees) with their popular Meca Dural family of models, the Pelissier brothers and their race-worthy La Perle models, and Nicolas Barra and his exquisite mid-twentieth century “Barralumin” creations. Other names that come up here also included: Pierre Caminade, with his beautiful Caminargent creations and their exotic octagonal tubing, and also Gnome et Rhône, with its deep heritage as an aircraft engine manufacturer that also diversified into motorcycles, velomotors and bicycles after World War Two.

Mitsubishi Heavy Industries, which was prohibited from producing aircraft during the American occupation of Japan, manufactured the “cross” bicycle out of surplus wartime duralumin in 1946. The “cross” was designed by Kiro Honjo, a former aircraft designer responsible for the Mitsubishi G4M.

Duralumin use in bicycle manufacturing faded in the 1970s and 1980s. Vitus (bicycle company) nonetheless released the venerable “979” frameset in 1979, a “Duralinox” model that became an instant classic among cyclists. The Vitus 979 was the first production aluminium frameset whose thin-wall 5083/5086 tubing was slip-fit and then glued together using a dry heat-activated epoxy. The result was an extremely lightweight but very durable frameset. Production of the Vitus 979 continued until 1992.

References

Works cited

Further reading 
 David Laughlin, Kazuhiro Hono. Handbook of Aluminum: Vol. 1: Physical Metallurgy and Processes. 
 Aluminum Paperback - Volume 1. 16th edition, Aluminum Verlag, Düsseldorf 2002, pp. 101 f., 114–116, 121, 139–141
 Friedrich Ostermann: Aluminum application technology. 3rd edition, Springer, 2014, pp. 117–124

Aluminium alloys
Aluminium–copper alloys